Physaria repanda, the Indian Canyon twinpod, is a species of plant in the family Brassicaceae  distributed in Utah. It is a perennial wildflower.

Description
It has dense, stellate, and pubescent trichomes. Its caudex is thick, and is around 1-2 dm long. Its radical leaves are rosulate and ascending. These leaves measure about 4–7 cm long and 1-2.5 cm wide, and can be shaped broadly ovate to almost orbicular. Its cauline leaves are oblanceolate, and measures 1.5–3 cm long. Its sepals are oblong and measure 7–9 mm long and 2–3 mm wide. Its petals are yellow, lingulate to spatulate, and measure 10–12 mm long and 3–4 mm wide. Its pedicels are ascending, and measure 1-1.5 cm long. Its siliques are didymous, densely pubescent, and can grow up to 1.5 cm high. Its replum can be pubescent or glabrous, and it measures 4–5 mm long. Its immature seeds are wingless and plump.

References

repanda
Flora of Utah
Flora of the Colorado Plateau and Canyonlands region
Endemic flora of the United States